François Clary (24 February 1725 – 20 January 1794) was a wealthy Irish-French merchant and is an ancestor of many European monarchs by two of his daughters. He was the father of Julie Clary, Queen of Naples and of Spain and the Indies by marriage to Joseph Bonaparte, a brother of Napoleon Bonaparte. He was also the father of Désirée Clary, who was first engaged to Napoleon and later became Queen of Sweden and Norway by marriage to King Charles XIV John.

Biography
François Clary was born on 24 February 1725 in Saint-Ferréol, Marseille, Kingdom of France, to Joseph Clary (1693–1748) and his wife, Françoise Agnès Ammoric (1705–1776), who were married on 27 February 1724 in Marseille. His father was of Irish descent. His grandparents were Jacques Clary (1673–1696) and Catherine Barosse (1673–1757), who were married on 24 November 1690 in Marseille. His great-grandparents were Antoine Clary and Marguerite Canolle. François Clary lived in Marseille and ran an import and export business. In trade with coffee and other colonial products he acquired great wealth. François Clary died on 20 January 1794 in Marseille, French Republic, aged 68.

Marriage and issue
On 13 April 1751 he married his first wife Gabrielle Fléchon (1732–1758) in Église Notre-Dame-des-Accoules, Marseille. They were parents of four children:
 François-Joseph Clary (31 January 1752 – 4 January 1753), died young
 Marie-Jeanne Clary (24 April 1754 – May 1815), she married first Louis Honoré Lejeans (1734–1794) and second Emmanuel Mathieu Pézenas, baron de Pluvinal (1754–1841)
 Marie Thérèse Catherine Clary (2 September 1755 – 1 November 1818), she married Lazare Lejeans (1738–1803)
 Étienne François Clary (8 August 1757 – 25 March 1823), he married Marcelle Guey (died 1804)

Gabrielle Fléchon died on 3 May 1758. On 26 June 1759 he married his second wife Françoise Rose Somis (Marseille, 30 August 1737 – Paris, 28 January 1815), daughter of Joseph Ignace Somis and Catherine Rose Soucheiron, in Église Saint-Ferréol les Augustins, Marseille. They had nine children.
 Joseph Nicolas Clary, 1er comte Clary et de l'Empire, (26 March 1760 – 6 June 1823) he married Anne Jeanne Rouyer (1791–1820)
 Joseph Honoré Clary (11 June 1762 – 23 July 1764), died young
 Marie Anne Rose Clary (25 April 1764 – 19 April 1835), she married Antoine-Ignace Anthoine, baron de Saint-Joseph et de l'Empire (1749–1826), Mayor of Marseille
 Marseille Clary (25 April 1764 – 22 March 1784), not married
 Justinien François Clary (15 April 1766 – 12 November 1794), not married
 Catherine Honorine Clary (19 February 1769 – 18 March 1843), she married Henri Joseph Gabriel Blait de Villeneufve (born 1748)
 Marie Julie Clary (26 December 1771 – 7 April 1845), she married Joseph Bonaparte (1768–1844), King of Naples and Sicily (1806–08), King of Spain and the Indies (1808–13) and elder brother of Napoleon Bonaparte 
 Basile Clary (12 January 1774 – 16 June 1781), died young
 Bernardine Eugénie Désirée Clary (8 November 1777 – 17 December 1860), she became engaged to Napoleon Bonaparte in 1795 but he broke off the engagement in the same year. She married Jean-Baptiste Bernadotte (1763–1844), King of Sweden and Norway (1818–44)

Descendants
François Clary and Françoise Rose Somis had 19 grandchildren, they include:

 Oscar Bernadotte (1799–1859), King of Sweden and Norway (1844–59), he married Joséphine de Beauharnais (1807–1876), daughter of Eugène de Beauharnais and Augusta of Bavaria
 Zénaïde Bonaparte (1801–1854), she married Charles Lucien Bonaparte (1803–1857), son of Lucien Bonaparte and Alexandrine de Bleschamp
 Charlotte Bonaparte (1802–1839), she married Napoléon Louis Bonaparte (1804–1831), son of Louis Bonaparte and Hortense de Beauharnais

The royal descendants of François Clary and Françoise Rose Somis include:

Julie Clary (1771–1845), Queen consort of Naples and Sicily and Queen consort of Spain and the Indies; Désirée Clary (1777–1860), Queen consort of Sweden and Norway; Oscar I of Sweden and Norway (1799–1859); Carl XV of Sweden and Norway (1826–1872); Oscar II of Sweden and Norway (1829–1907); Louise of Sweden (1851–1926), Queen consort of Denmark; Gustaf V of Sweden (1858–1950); Christian X of Denmark (1870–1847); Haakon VII of Norway (1872–1957); Gustaf VI Adolf of Sweden (1882–1973); Frederick IX of Denmark (1899–1972); Märtha of Sweden, Crown Princess of Norway (1901-1954); Olav V of Norway (1903–1991); Astrid of Sweden (1905–1935), Queen consort of Belgium; Ingrid of Sweden (1910–2000), Queen consort of Denmark; Joséphine Charlotte of Belgium (1927–2005), Grand Duchess consort of Luxembourg; Baudouin of Belgium (1930–1993); Albert II of Belgium (born 1934); Harald V of Norway (born 1937); Margrethe II of Denmark (born 1940); Carl XVI Gustaf of Sweden (born 1946); Anne-Marie of Denmark (born 1946), Queen consort of Greece; Henri, Grand Duke of Luxembourg (born 1955); Philippe of Belgium (born 1960).

References

Further reading 
 Académie de Marseille, Dictionnaire des marseillais, Edisud, Marseille, 2003 
 Adrien Blés, Dictionnaire historique des rues de Marseille, Ed. Jeanne Laffitte, Marseille, 1989  
  

1794 deaths
1725 births
French merchants
French nobility
Clary family
18th-century French businesspeople